was a historic hotel in Tatemitsukura-chō (竪三ツ蔵町), Naka-ku, Nagoya, Japan.

History 
It was constructed in 1888 out of wood in a Western style. It offered Japanese rooms as well as Western-style rooms. The proprietor in 1901 was T. Takata. The proprietor was by trade a carpenter who designed the dining room in maple and hinoki, as well as reading rooms, smoking rooms and card rooms. On the exterior the hotel had a large dome-shaped roof that could be seen above the rest of the surrounding buildings.

Prince Arthur of Connaught stayed here during his first visit to Japan in end of February, 1906.

The plot today is occupied by modern buildings.

See also 
 Nagoya Kanko Hotel
 Fujiya Hotel
 Nikkō Kanaya Hotel
 Nara Hotel
 Imperial Hotel, Tokyo
 Hōshi Ryokan
 Dōgo Onsen

References

External links 

1888 establishments in Japan
Buildings of the Meiji period
History of Nagoya
Hotels established in 1888
Hotel buildings completed in 1888
Hotels in Nagoya
Naka-ku, Nagoya